Al-Suqaylabiyah District is a district (mantiqah) administratively belonging to Hama Governorate, Syria. At the 2004 official census, the district had a population of 240,091. Its administrative centre is the city of Al-Suqaylabiyah. The district includes most of Al-Ghab plain.

Sub-districts
The district of Hama is divided into five sub-districts or nahiyahs (population according to 2004 official census):
Al-Suqaylabiyah Subdistrict (ناحية السقيلبية): population 49,686.
Tell Salhab Subdistrict (ناحية تلسلحب): population 38,783.
Al-Ziyarah Subdistrict (ناحية الزيارة): population 38,872.
Shathah Subdistrict (ناحية شطحة): population 25,273.
Qalaat al-Madiq Subdistrict (ناحية قلعة المضيق): population 85,597.

References

 
Al-Ghab Plain